Photon is the third studio album from Japanese electronica/rock duo Boom Boom Satellites, released on July 24, 2002.

Track listing

Photon – Commin' 2 a Phase 

Photon – Commin' 2 a Phase is an alternate version of Photon, released in the UK by Different Records. It features an adjusted track list, re-recorded versions of a number of tracks and different artwork. It was released on September 29, 2003. Track 6 contains samples from "Mannequin Republic" by At The Drive In.

Commin' 2 a Phase track listing

Personnel
Credits adapted from liner notes.
 A&R – Hanako Tabata
 A&R [International] – Bob Fisher
 Art Direction, Design – Shin-Ichiro Hirata*
 Artwork [Cover Art Coordinated By] – Shin Sasaki
 Coordinator [Coordinated By] – Umu Productions U.K.
 Directed By – Shin Yasui
 Drums [Additional Drummer] – Naoki Hirai
 Executive-Producer – Lucy Tonegi, Shunsuke Muramatsu
 Illustration [Cover Illustration] – Mitsuki Nakamura
 Management [Artist] – Hiroki Sakaida, Lucy Tonegi
 Management [International] – Sean Phillips, Sekui Mirata
 Mastered By [Mastering Engineer] – Tom Coyne
 Mixed By – Masayuki Nakano
 Other [International Marketing] – Archie Meguro, Sampei Yamaguchi, Tomoko "Tomi" Yamamoto
 Producer – Boom Boom Satellites
 Programmed By, Bass – Masayuki Nakano
 Technician [Instruments] – Yasuyuki "Texas" Oguro*
 Vocals, Guitar – Michiyuki Kawashima

References

External links 
 Boom Boom Satellites official website

2002 albums
Boom Boom Satellites albums